Algarrobo is a barrio in the municipality of Yauco, Puerto Rico. Its population in 2010 was 419.

History
Puerto Rico was ceded by Spain in the aftermath of the Spanish–American War under the terms of the Treaty of Paris of 1898 and became an unincorporated territory of the United States. In 1899, the United States Department of War conducted a census of Puerto Rico finding that the population of Algarrobo barrio was 952.

Geography 
Algarrobo barrio is located in central Yauco in the Cordillera Central. The barrio is crossed by the Yauco River which flows from Lake Luchetti in the north towards downtown Yauco in the south.

Demographics

See also

 List of communities in Puerto Rico

References

Barrios of Yauco, Puerto Rico